McWilliams is a surname. Notable people with the surname include
Reese guarino Mcwilliams 

Alfred McWilliams (1844–1928), Canadian politician from Prince Edward Island
Bill McWilliams (1910–1997), American baseball player
Brendan McWilliams (1944–2007), Irish meteorologist and science writer
Carey McWilliams (journalist) (1905–1980), American author, editor, and lawyer
Carey McWilliams (marksman) (b. 1973), American author, marksman, and skydiver
Caroline McWilliams (1945–2010), American television actress; former wife of Michael Keaton
Christopher 'Crip' McWilliams (1963–2008), Irish nationalist; convicted of the murder of the LVF leader Billy Wright
Cynthia Kaye McWilliams (contemporary), American actress
David McWilliams (American football) (contemporary), American college football coach
David McWilliams (economics pundit) (b. 1966), Irish economist, commentator, and author
David McWilliams (musician) (1945–2002), Northern Irish singer, songwriter, and guitarist
Derek McWilliams (b. 1966), Scottish football player
Douglas McWilliams (born 1951), British economist 
Edmund McWilliams (contemporary), American diplomat and ambassador
Elsie McWilliams (1896–1985), American songwriter
Eric McWilliams (b. 1950), American basketball player
Fleming McWilliams (contemporary), American singer and songwriter
Francis McWilliams (1926–2022), Scottish engineer and Lord Mayor of London
George McWilliams (1865–1907), Australian doctor and MP
Jackie McWilliams (b. 1964), Irish Olympic field hockey player
Jelena McWilliams (b. 1973), U.S. banker, nominee to lead Federal Deposit Insurance Corporation (FDIC)
Jeremy McWilliams (b. 1964), Irish motorcycle road racer
Joe McWilliams (1904–1996), American inventor, industrial engineer, and nationalist
John D. McWilliams (1891–1975), American politician from Connecticut; U.S. Representative 1943–45
Johnny McWilliams (b. 1972), American football player
Julia Carolyn McWilliams, birth name of American cooking teacher, author, and television personality Julia Child
Larry McWilliams (b. 1954), American baseball player
Monica McWilliams (b. 1954), Northern Ireland academic and politician
Peter McWilliams (1949–2000), American marijuana activist and writer
Rhys McWilliams (b. 1985), English ice hockey player
Roland Fairbairn McWilliams (1874–1957), Canadian politician from Manitoba
Ruben McWilliams (1901–1984), New Zealand rugby player
Shorty McWilliams (1926–1997), American football player
Taj McWilliams-Franklin (b. 1970), American women’s basketball player
Taylor McWilliams (born 1980/1981), American real estate developer
William McWilliams (1856–1929), Australian politician from Tasmania
Wilson Carey McWilliams (1933–2005), American political scientist and writer

Fictional characters 
Lally McWilliams, a fictional character in the anime Gundam SEED DESTINY

References